Elizabeth Wrottesley, Duchess of Grafton (1745–1822) married Augustus FitzRoy, 3rd Duke of Grafton (sometime duke and prime minister) on 24 June 1769 at Woburn Abbey in Bedfordshire, England.

Wrottesley was the daughter of Sir Richard Wrottesley, 7th Baronet. Her portrait was painted by Thomas Gainsborough and hangs in the National Gallery of Victoria in Melbourne.

Family
Wrottesley had the following children:
 Lord Henry FitzRoy (9 April 17707 June 1828), clergyman; he married Caroline Pigot (died 1 January 1835) on 10 September 1800 and had five children. Ancestor of Daisy Greville, Countess of Warwick.
 Lord Frederick FitzRoy (born 16 September 1774; died young).
 Lady Augusta FitzRoy (177929 June 1839), who married Rev. George F. Tavel (died 1829) on 19 November 1811.
 Lady Frances FitzRoy (1 June 17807 January 1866), who married the 1st Baron Churchill on 25 November 1800.
 Admiral Lord William FitzRoy (1 June 178213 May 1857), who married Georgiana Raikes (died 2 December 1861) in 1816 and had two children.
 Lord John Edward FitzRoy (24 September 178528 December 1856), MP, died unmarried.
 Lady Charlotte FitzRoy (died 23 June 1857).
 Lady Elizabeth FitzRoy (died 13 March 1839), who married her cousin Lt. Gen. The Hon. William FitzRoy (1773–1837), son of the 1st Baron Southampton, on 4 July 1811.
 Lady Isabella FitzRoy (died 10 December 1866), who married Barrington Pope Blachford (3 December 178314 May 1816) on 11 August 1812.

References

English duchesses
1745 births
1822 deaths
Spouses of British politicians
Wives of knights